Anzolu is a village and municipality in the Lerik Rayon of Azerbaijan.  It has a population of 395.  The municipality consists of the villages of Anzolu and Təngəbin.

References 

Populated places in Lerik District